Arthur D. "Art" Hershey (born November 14, 1937) was a Republican member of the Pennsylvania House of Representatives for the 13th District and was elected in 1982. He and his wife, Joyce, live in Cochranville, Pennsylvania and have 4 children and 11 grandchildren. He retired prior to the 2008 election, and was succeeded by Democrat Tom Houghton.

References

External links
Pennsylvania House of Representatives - Art Hershey official PA House website (archived)
Pennsylvania House Republican Caucus - Representative Art Hershey official Party website (archived)
Biography, voting record, and interest group ratings at Project Vote Smart

1937 births
Living people
Republican Party members of the Pennsylvania House of Representatives
Pennsylvania State University alumni
People from Chester County, Pennsylvania
People from Lancaster County, Pennsylvania